Hurling in County Kildare is administered by the Kildare County Board of the Gaelic Athletic Association.

County teams

The Kildare senior hurling team represents Kildare in the National Hurling League and the All-Ireland Senior Hurling Championship. There are also intermediate, junior, under-21 and minor teams.

References

External links
Kildare GAA

 
Hurling